Kiryandongo is a town in the Western Region of  Uganda. It is the main municipal, administrative, and commercial center of Kiryandongo District.

Location
The coordinates of the town are 1°57'09.0"N, 32°08'20.0"E (Latitude:1.9525; Longitude:32.1389).

Population
In 2014, the national population census put the population of Kiryandongo at 31,610.

Points of interest
The following points of interest lie within the town or close to its borders:

 headquarters of Kiryandongo District administration
 offices of Kiryandongo Town Council
 Kiryandongo central market
 Kiryandongo General Hospital, a 109-bed public hospital administered by the Uganda Ministry of Health

See also
 Karuma Power Station
 List of cities and towns in Uganda

References

Kiryandongo District
Bunyoro sub-region
Cities in the Great Rift Valley
Populated places in Western Region, Uganda